Abbeville is a railway station serving the town of Abbeville, Somme department, in Hauts-de-France, northern France. It is on the Longueau–Boulogne railway and is the terminus of the Abbeville–Eu railway. It is served principally by TER Hauts-de-France trains.

History

The Gare d'Abbeville was built by the Nord company in 1856 in regional seaside style.

The station was formerly linked to Lille by a line which ran between Abbeville and Fives via Béthune and Saint-Pol-sur-Ternoise. The Abbeville - Saint-Pol-sur-Ternoise section closed in 1968.

It was also formerly served by a metre gauge local interest line to Dompierre-sur-Authie, part of the Réseau des Bains de Mer of the Chemins de fer départementaux de la Somme, which opened on 19 June 1892 and closed to passenger traffic in 1947.

The building, which is timber faced with red brick, was declared a historic monument on 28 December 1984. It was the last wooden station built in France until the Meuse TGV in 2007.

In 2006 Abbeville station won second prize in the special category for stations of the annual Villes et Villages Fleuris contest, an award to recognise particularly attractive passenger accommodations and landscaping and which takes into account the integration of the station into its surroundings.

In 2007 the Communauté de communes de l'Abbevillois undertook renovations to convert the station into a more modern and welcoming multimodal facility.

Station
The building has a staffed ticket window as well as ticket machines and offers handicapped-accessible services.

Services
The station is served by TER Hauts-de-France trains (Calais - Amiens line). Train services to Le Tréport were discontinued in 2018.

References

Railway stations in Somme (department)
Monuments historiques of Somme (department)
Railway stations in France opened in 1856
Gare